SS William Clay Ford was a bulk freighter built for hauling material on the Great Lakes.  She was named for William Clay Ford Sr., grandson of Henry Ford.  Her keel was laid in 1952 at River Rouge, Michigan by the Great Lakes Engineering Works, and she was launched in 1953.  The ship was a part of the Ford Motor Company fleet of ore carriers and made her home port at Ford's River Rouge Plant, south of Detroit, Michigan.  The first captain of William Clay Ford was John Jameson Pearce of Dearborn, Michigan.

The Anderson and Ford had made it to safety at Whitefish Bay, but went back into the storm at the request of the Coast Guard to look for survivors of the Fitzgerald. Because of the bravery and valor demonstrated that night by Captain Don Erickson and his crew, they were presented with many accolades including a plaque bestowed upon them by the Great Lakes Maritime Institute recognizing their role in the search for Edmund Fitzgerald. It reads: 

In 1979 the hull of William Clay Ford was lengthened 120 feet.

In 1984 ownership was transferred to the Rouge Steel Corporation.  In December 1984, she hauled her last load of cargo from Duluth, Minnesota, to Rouge Basin, south of Detroit.

In 1985 she was renamed US 266029, her registry number, as a newly renamed SS William Clay Ford (2) was put into the fleet.

In August 1986, US 266029 was towed from her moorings to the Detroit Marine Terminal where the pilot house was removed for display and exhibition, at the Dossin Great Lakes Museum on Detroit's Belle Isle.  The hull was scrapped in Port Maitland, Ontario, in 1987.

References

Merchant ships of the United States
Great Lakes freighters
1953 ships
Ford Motor Company
Ships built in Ecorse, Michigan